I Love You Again is an MGM comedy released in 1940. It was directed by W.S. Van Dyke and starred William Powell and Myrna Loy, all three of whom were prominently involved in the Thin Man film series.

Plot
In 1940, while on a cruise, stodgy, overly frugal businessman Larry Wilson is hit on the head with an oar while rescuing a drunk "Doc" Ryan from the water. He wakes up and remembers that he is actually a suave con man named George Carey. George's last memory is of going to place a large bet in 1931.

When the ship docks at New York, he is met by Kay, whom he discovers is his wife. She however is in the process of divorcing him to marry Herbert. They go home to the small town of Habersville, Pennsylvania. George talks Doc (who is also a con artist) into masquerading as a physician treating him, partly out of curiosity, but mostly because of greed, after seeing the enormous balance in his checking account. That turns out to be a dead end (the money is only held in trust for the Community Chest), so he decides to swindle people using his alter ego's sterling reputation. He sends for his old crony Duke Sheldon, who plants oil on a lot George owns.

A complication arises when he falls in love with Kay a second time. She however wants nothing further to do with her boring cheapskate of a husband. George attempts to win back Kay's affections, while also trying to sell his land to several greedy leading citizens of the town. George uses his other persona as a celebrated woodsman to have his troop of Junior Rangers (many of them the sons of local businessmen) stumble upon the oil. This gets back to their fathers, who quickly offer to buy the land.

In the end, wanting to remain with Kay who now loves him as George, he decides to abort the swindle, but Duke will not let him. They fight, and George is knocked out by a punch. When he comes to, he seems to be Larry once more. Duke leaves in disgust, but having hooked the biggest scammer of the citizens in a side deal. When Doc muses that one knock on the head reversed the effect of another, Kay, who knows all and wants George back, picks up a vase. Before she can bring it down on his head, "Larry" proves that he was only faking to get rid of Duke.

Cast 

 William Powell as Lawrence 'Larry' Wilson / George Carey
 Myrna Loy as Katherine 'Kay' Wilson
 Frank McHugh as 'Doc' Ryan
 Edmund Lowe as Duke Sheldon
 Donald Douglas as Herbert
 Nella Walker as Kay's mother
 Carl "Alfalfa" Switzer as Leonard Harkspur Jr.
 Pierre Watkin as W.H. Sims
 Paul Stanton as Edward Littlejohn Sr.
 Morgan Wallace as Phil Belenson
 Charles Arnt as Mr. Billings

Reception 
Reviews of the film were generally positive. New York Times critic Bosley Crowther praised the film writing: "Mr. Powell and Miss Loy, no matter what their names, are one of our most versatile and frisky connubial comedy teams, and, given a script as daffy as the one here in evidence, they can make an hour and a half spin like a roulette wheel." W.S from Motion Picture Daily stated that the audience was in "continuous laughter and applause throughout the film" and claimed that “M-G-M has made the funniest motion picture this industry has seen in 10 years."

Other critics agreed. Laura Lee, critic for the  Philadelphia Bulletin, wrote, "Too ridiculous for words, but ‘I Love You Again’ is extremely funny. You may feel silly for laughing but laugh you must." Gilbert Kanour of the Baltimore Evening Sun said, "William Powell and Myrna Loy have lost none of their skill in provoking laughter...a witty and inventive plot."

According to Motion Picture Daily, the film did above average business at the box office during its first two weeks.

Radio adaptations 
Lux Radio Theatre adapted the film twice, first in 1941 with Loy and Cary Grant, then in 1948 with Powell and Ann Sothern (Loy was supposed to reprise her film role in this adaptation, but had to drop out due to retakes on a film).

References

External links
 
 
 
 

1940 films
1940 romantic comedy films
1940s screwball comedy films
American romantic comedy films
American screwball comedy films
American black-and-white films
Films scored by Franz Waxman
Films about amnesia
Films based on American novels
Films directed by W. S. Van Dyke
Films set in Pennsylvania
Films set in 1940
Metro-Goldwyn-Mayer films
Films with screenplays by Charles Lederer
Films with screenplays by Harry Kurnitz
1940s English-language films
1940s American films
Films about con artists